The 2014 IIHF U18 World Championship Division III was a pair of international under-18 ice hockey tournaments organised by the International Ice Hockey Federation. The Division III A and Division III B tournaments represent the sixth and the seventh tier of the IIHF World U18 Championship.

Division III A
The Division III A tournament was played in Sofia, Bulgaria, from 24 to 30 March 2014.

Participants

Final standings

Results
All times are local. (Eastern European Time – UTC+2 / 30 March 2014: Eastern European Summer Time – UTC+3)

Division III B
The Division III B tournament was played in İzmit, Turkey, from 13 to 15 February 2014.

Participants

Final standings

Results
All times are local. (Eastern European Time – UTC+2)

References

IIHF World U18 Championship Division III
III
2014 in Turkish sport
International ice hockey competitions hosted by Bulgaria
International ice hockey competitions hosted by Turkey
Sports competitions in Sofia
Sport in İzmit
World
World